Sonny Boy is an original Japanese anime television series animated by Madhouse and written and directed by Shingo Natsume. The series aired from July to October 2021.

Plot
Midway through a seemingly endless day of summer vacation, third-year middle school student Nagara and his class, along with transfer student Nozomi and the aloof and mysterious Mizuho, are suddenly transported to an alternate dimension. The group calls the new dimension "This World", and finds it has its own set of rules and physics. Over time, while trying to get back home, they realize that they have individual supernatural abilities, but also find it difficult to navigate their own interpersonal relationships.

The class later splits into two groups due to internal conflicts. As both the groups continue journeying to find their way back home, they discover many other students who have spent thousands of years in other "This Worlds".

Characters

Production and release
The anime television series was announced on April 28, 2021. The series was animated by  Madhouse and written and directed by Shingo Natsume, with original character designs provided by Hisashi Eguchi and Norifumi Kugai adapting the designs for animation. While the first episode was given an early premiere on June 19, 2021, the series officially aired from July 16 to October 1, 2021 on Tokyo MX and other channels. Ging Nang Boyz performed the series' theme song "Shōnen Shōjo". 

The series was licensed outside of Asia by Funimation. On September 14, 2021, Funimation announced the series would receive an English dub, which premiered on September 16. Following Sony's acquisition of Crunchyroll, the series was moved to Crunchyroll. Medialink licensed the series in South and Southeast Asia and streamed it in their YouTube channel.

Episode list

Soundtrack 
The Sonny Boy Soundtrack was released on September 8, 2021. Shinichirō Watanabe served as the musical advisor.

 Ging Nang Boyz – 少年少女
 Sunset Rollercoaster – Broken Windows
 Sunset Rollercoaster – Seagull
 VIDEOTAPEMUSIC – Summer Storm
 The Natsuyasumi Band – Tune from diamond
 mitsume – 夜釣り
 Sunset Rollercoaster – Let There Be Light Again
 Ogawa & Tokoro – Beacon
 Mid-Air Thief – Yamabiko’s Theme
 Mid-Air Thief – Kodama’s Theme
 Ogawa & Tokoro – Soft Oversight
 mitsume – ソウとセイジ
 Kaneyorimasaru – Kyo no Uta
 The Natsuyasumi Band – Lightship
 mitsume – スペア
 toe – サニーボーイ・ラプソディ
 Conisch – Lune
 Conisch – Jugement
 Conisch – Tour
 Conisch – Soleil
 Conisch – 旅立ちの日に

Reception

Accolades 
Sonny Boy received the Excellence Award in the animation category at the 25th Japan Media Arts Festival. The series was nominated in two categories in the 2022 Crunchyroll Anime Awards Anime of the Year and Director of the Year. The series was also nominated for the Anime Trending Awards in four categories "Best in Original Screenplay", "Best in Sceneries and Visuals", "Mystery or Psychological Anime of the Year" and "SciFi or Mecha Anime of the Year".

Critical reception

Notes

References

External links
Anime official website 

Anime with original screenplays
Crunchyroll anime
Madhouse (company)
Medialink
School life in anime and manga
Science fiction anime and manga
Survival anime and manga
Tokyo MX original programming